Saint Meingold (Mengold, Meingaud) (died 892) is said to have been count of Huy, who was murdered by his opponents in 892. It is possible that the holy Meingold was a different person confused with the count, with both having been killed in the same year.

His feast day is 8 February.

External links
8 February saints on Saint Patrick's Church
Meingold on Patron Saints Index
Meingold on Nominis

Bibliography
Philippe George : Les Miracles de saint Mengold de Huy. Témoignage privilégié d'un culte à la fin du XIIe siècle, dans Bulletin de la Commission royale d'Histoire, vol.152 (1986), pp.25-47.

Year of birth unknown
892 deaths
9th-century Christian saints
People from Huy